Donato Grima (born July 22, 1949 in San Miguel de Tucumán) is an Argentine visual artist.  He studied arts and design. During the 1970s, he moved to Caracas, Venezuela. He did not return to his home country until the mid 1980s, together with the restoration of democracy. From the 1990s until 2001 he lived in Spain. His painting The Patriarchs is in the collection of the Museo del Barrio of New York City. Other museums and private collections in several countries in Latin America and Europe bought part of his work. By 1993 he founded, in Argentina, The Center of Art & Design, institution devoted to the education in art and design. In 2009 he created his art gallery Art Territory in Tucumán.

Awards 
Among his numerous awards, the following can be highlighted: 
 City of Santa Fe Prize, National Hall of Santa Fe, Argentina, 1988.
 First Prize Poem Illustrated Regional Hall (poem by Jose Augusto Moreno), Museum of Fine Arts, Tucumán, Argentina, 1988.
 Honorable Mention Award National Drawing Exhibition, Museum of Fine Arts, Tucumán, 1987.
 First Prize 50th Salon Nacional de Rosario, Argentina. 1986.
 First Prize Poem Illustrated Regional Hall (poem by Alberto Rojas Paz), 1972.
 Second Prize San Pablo Museum of Fine Arts, Tucumán, Argentina, 1972.

His work in museums and collections 

 Museo del Barrio, New York City EE.UU.
 Castagnino Museum, Rosario, Argentina.
 Museo Provincial Rosa Galisteo de Rodríguez, Santa Fe, Argentina
 Museo Provincial de Bellas Artes Timoteo Navarro, Tucumán, Argentina
 Museo Provincial de Bellas Artes de Salta, Salta, Argentina.
 Robert Bosh Collection, Madrid, Spain
 Benito Moreno Rojo Collection, Madrid, Spain
 Rudiger Wolf Collection, Hamburg, Germany
among other collections of Venezuela, Colombia, Brazil and Italy

Published books

"Donato Grima / Antologia de Obras" 2016
Donato Grima / visual work, Madrid: Ediciones Infantas, 1991.
 Cristina Bulacio and Donato Grima, Dos Visiones sobre Borges, Buenos Aires: Ediciones Gaglianone, 1998.
 Roberto Espinosa, Donato Grima, Silvando Cielos”, Tucumán: Donato Grima, Digital Editions, 2009.

Exhibitions

Individual international exhibitions
 2014, Museum of Fine Arts, Tlaxcala, Mexico.
 1998, Infantas Gallery, Madrid, Spain.
 1997, Carib Art Gallery, New York City, United States.
 1994, String Studio, New York City, United States.
 1994, Carib Art Gallery, New York City, United States.
 1994, Casino de Costa Blanca Villajoyosa, Spain.
 1991, Infantas Gallery, Madrid, Spain.
 1991, Geshe Gallery Mundt, Hamburg, Germany.
 1978, Imaginary Gallery Bogotá, Colombia.
 1977, Ochre Gallery, Caracas, Venezuela.
 1976, Ochre Gallery, Caracas, Venezuela.

Individual exhibitions in Argentina
 2013, Museum of Fine Arts Timoteo Navarro Tucumán.
 2011, University of Jose C. Paz Buenos Aires.
 2011, Gallery Palermo H Buenos Aires.
 2008, Museum of Contemporary Art (MAC) Salta.
 2007, Museum of Fine Arts, Salta.
 2006, Museum of Bellas Artes Timoteo Navarro Tucumán.
 2004, Cultural Center, National University of Tucumán .
 2001, Cultural Center, National University of Tucumán .
 1998, Centro Cultural Borges, Buenos Aires.
 1997, Cultural Center, National University of Tucumán .
 1995, Cultural Center, National University of Tucumán .
 1992, Cultural Center, National University of Tucumán .
 1990, Gallery Gloria Aleman Salta.
 1989, Gallery High Level, Buenos Aires.
 1988, Museum Octavio de la Colina, La Rioja.
 1981, Museum of Modern Art, Mendoza.
 1980, Ministry of Tourism, Tucumán.
 1972, Austral Hall, Tucumán.
 1972, Casa d'Italia, Paraná.
 1971, Gallery "Z" Tucumán.

 References 
Some notes of his biography have been extracted from:
 La Cultura en el Tucuman del Siglo XX, ed. Roberto Espinosa, Dictionary, Tucumán: Ediciones Universidad Nacional de Tucumán, 2006.
 Bulacio, Cristina, Dos Miradas sobre Borges, Buenos Aires: Ed. Gaglianone, 1998.
 Urrutia, Antonio, "Los Aquelarres de Donato Grima", Madrid, Correo del Arte, n° 104, marzo 1994.
 Correo del Arte y Correo del Arte Hispano, New York, enero 1994. Ver notas de Antonio Morales.
 Svanascini, Osvaldo, Asociación Argentina de Críticos de Arte, Historia crítica del arte argentino, Buenos Aires : Dirección de Relaciones Externas y Comunicaciones, TELECOM Argentina, 1995.Art now gallery guide: International, Vol.16, Nº 7-8, NJ, USA: Art Now, Inc., 1997.
 Diario La Nación, Madrid, 1991.
 Diario Cinco días, Madrid, 1991.
 Diario ABC, Madrid, 1991. Read Antonio Manuel Campoy's article.
 El Punto de las Artes, Madrid, 1991.
 Revista Correo del Arte, Madrid, 1991, Read Luis Hernández del Pozo's article.
 Diario Ámbito financiero, Buenos Aires, 1989. Read César Magrini's article.
 Diario La Gaceta de Tucumán.
 Diario Noticias, de Tucumán, 1972, 1974.
 El Pueblo, septiembre 1973.
 El Tribuno, Salta, 1976.
 Diario El Intransigente'' de Salta.
And other publications on-line.

External links 
 Diario El Intransigente de Salta
 Donato Grima’s Paintings, La Gaceta de Tucumán
 artist's weblog, DonatoGrimaWeb

1949 births
Living people
Argentine painters
Argentine male painters
Argentine contemporary artists
People from San Miguel de Tucumán